Clarence K. Moniba, Ph.D (born March 15, 1979) is a former Liberian government official. He served as the youngest person in the country’s history to be named Minister of State without Portfolio, as well as the Chairman of the Board of the Liberia Electricity Corporation.  He was a Principal Advisor and Project Manager to the President of Liberia and a leading figure on infrastructure development in Liberia from 2014 – 2018.  Dr. Moniba at various times also headed the Diaspora Engagement Unit, the Philanthropy Secretariat and the President’s Delivery Unit which oversaw implementation of priority projects.  Moniba in previous roles has worked with the African Development Bank’s High Level Panel on Post Conflict & Fragile States, as well as the United Nations Post-2015 Development Agenda. He was awarded the national medal Knight Commander of the Most Venerable Order of Pioneers - which then President Ellen Johnson Sirleaf stated was for his outstanding and distinguished service in government.

Prior to his work in the Liberian government, Moniba was a professional American football player in the Arena League (2001–04). He is also the author of The Official Guidebook to a College Football Scholarship

He was the victim of several 419 and fake lottery scams, which claimed that he was in possession of, and willing to trade millions of dollars in diamonds and African gold.

Political career 
Dr. Clarence Moniba, the leader of the Liberian National Union (LINU), is a prominent candidate in the upcoming 2023 Liberian Presidential Elections, which are scheduled to be held on October 10th. His campaign platform, "A New Liberia," prioritizes self-sufficiency in rice production and aims to provide two years of technical and vocational training in high school during students' junior and senior years to empower the country's youth, who make up over 70% of the population.

In addition to promoting economic development through job creation and poverty reduction, Dr. Moniba has also vowed to fight corruption by mandating asset declarations for all government officials and imposing mandatory jail time and restitution for those found guilty of corrupt practices. He has also expressed his commitment to improving healthcare, infrastructure, and education reform while promoting human rights and protecting the environment.

As a candidate for the Liberian Presidential Elections, Dr. Moniba plans to focus on voter education, youth empowerment, anti-corruption measures, and foreign relations while ensuring national security. He believes that by addressing these key issues, Liberia can build a prosperous and sustainable future for all its citizens.

Acting career

Moniba performed lead football stunts in the movie Radio, where he made the game-winning diving touchdown catch for the home team T.L. Hanna High School. He also played a lead football stunt role in the movie Invincible where he went up going against the main character Vince Papale, played by Mark Walhberg, and he appeared in several football action scenes of We Are Marshall.

Book Publications

Moniba wrote The Official Guidebook to a College Football Scholarship which was published nationwide in the United States in 2011.

Football career

Moniba played his college football at New Mexico State University from 1999 to 2001. He went on to play professional football for four years in the Arena Football League for the Carolina and New York organizations.

Personal life

Clarence is the youngest son of Liberia's former Vice President, Dr. Harry F. Moniba, who served in that capacity from 1984 to 1990.

Education

Moniba earned his Ph.D from New Mexico State University where he graduated with a degree in Rhetoric and Professional Communications.  His focus was on Intercultural and International Communications.  He earned his master's degree in International Relations. His published thesis is entitled "Ethnic Exclusion in Government – A Case Study of the Republic of Liberia". 

Moniba earned a Masters in Public Administration from the John F. Kennedy, School of Government at Harvard University.

References

External links
Moniba Foundation 
 Edwin G. Genoway, Jr, "Harry Moniba’s Son Challenges Government", The New Dawn, February 27, 2013.

Aggies in the Pros. New Mexico State University

The Liberia Electricity Corporation

The Official Guidebook to a College Football Scholarship

1979 births
Liberian writers
Liberian male film actors
New Mexico State Aggies football players
New York Dragons players
Liberian expatriates in the United States
Liberian diplomats
Liberian businesspeople
Living people
Harvard Kennedy School alumni